Yok Don National Park (Vietnamese: Vườn quốc gia Yok Đôn) is a national park located in Krông Na commune, Buôn Đôn District, Đắk Lắk Province, Tây Nguyên of Vietnam, 40 km west of Buôn Ma Thuột city. The park was established in 1991 to protect 582 km² of a biological area of khộp lowland forest. The total area is 1,155.45 km² (not including a buffer zone of 1,138.9 km2).  It borders Mondulkiri Protected Forest (Cambodia) to the west and is part of maybe the largest protected area complex in southeast Asia

Biodiversity
The vegetation at Yok Don National Park is dominated by a mosaic of deciduous forest and semi-evergreen (mixed deciduous) forest, with smaller areas of evergreen forest, particularly on hills and along watercourses. 474 vascular plant species have been recorded in the park.

Yok Don National Park has one of the most biodiverse forest in Vietnam. This park is an important site for the conservation of globally endangered species such as Indochinese tiger, Indochinese leopard, Indian elephant and gaur. However, the population of the four species at the park have suffered major declines.

References

External links
Vietnam National Parks

National parks of Vietnam
Protected areas established in 1986
1986 establishments in Vietnam
Geography of Đắk Lắk province